Kimberlee Green  (born 5 March 1986 in Sydney, Australia) is a former Australian international netball player. Green was the captain of the Giants Netball team in the Suncorp Super Netball league and represented the Australian national netball team on 74 occasions.

Biography

Green is the daughter of South Sydney Rabbitohs footballer Michael Green and Olympic & Commonwealth Games swimmer Denise Langford; her great-grandfather is former New South Wales politician Fred Green. She is married to New South Wales Blues cricketer Trent Copeland.

Green played six years in the Commonwealth Bank Trophy, for the Sydney Swifts and AIS Canberra Darters. With the start of the ANZ Championship, Green signed with Sydney franchise the New South Wales Swifts, which won the inaugural championship in 2008. Later that year, she was selected for the Australian Netball Diamonds team. During her international career, Green has won a bronze medal at the 2009 World Netball Series in Manchester, and a silver medal at the 2010 Commonwealth Games in Delhi, a gold medal at the 2011 World Netball Championships in Singapore and a gold medal at the 2014 Commonwealth Games in Glasgow.

In 2011, for the first time for Australia, Green played at the Wing Defence (WD) position in the first of three tests against Jamaica. In 2014 Green was named in the Australian Netball Team to compete at the 2014 Commonwealth Games who went on to win gold. Green went on to captain NSW Swifts in the 2014 season. After the 2015 Netball World Cup, which Green was part of as a gold-medallist with Australia, she announced her retirement from international netball.

In 2017, she was appointed inaugural captain of the Giants Netball team. She suffered a season-ending ACL injury in the Giants' round five win over the Adelaide Thunderbirds in Canberra. She returned to captain the Giants to a preliminary final in the 2018 season. On 22 August 2019, Green announced her retirement from professional netball.

In 2021 Green was appointed to the role of Opens Head Coach for the North Shore United in the NSW Premier League, following the departure of former coach Bec Bulley.

Awards and recognition
 2022 Australia Day Honours, Medal of the Order of Australia
 2014 ANZ Championship joint-MVP
 2014 FOXTEL ANZ Championship All-Star Team (WA)
 2013–2014 QBE NSW Swifts Most Valued Player
 2011–2014 NSW Swifts' Members' Player of the Year
 2010 NSW Swifts' Players' Player

Netball career facts
 2015 World Championship gold medal
 2014 Australian Netball Diamonds Captain (England Series)
 2014 Australian Netball Diamonds Commonwealth Games Netball Gold Medal
 2014 Australian Netball Diamonds Vice-Captain
 2014 NSW Swifts Captain
 2013 Australian Netball Diamonds Vice-Captain in two-test Malawi Queens series
 2012–2013 NSW Swifts co-Captain
 2011 World Championship gold medal (extra-time)
 2010 Commonwealth Games silver medallist (double extra-time)
 2008 ANZ Championship victory with the NSW Swifts (inaugural season)
 2006–2007 CBT Champions

Personal life
Green married NSW cricketer Trent Copeland in August 2012. In June 2020, the couple announced on Instagram that they were expecting their first child, due in December 2020. Green and Copeland welcomed their son, Lennon Green Copeland, on 30 November 2020.

References

External links
 Giants Netball Profile
 Netball Australia Profile
 Netball Draft Central profile

New South Wales Swifts players
Giants Netball players
Commonwealth Games silver medallists for Australia
Netball players at the 2010 Commonwealth Games
Netball players from Sydney
People from the Sutherland Shire
1986 births
Living people
Recipients of the Medal of the Order of Australia
AIS Canberra Darters players
Commonwealth Games gold medallists for Australia
Netball players at the 2014 Commonwealth Games
Commonwealth Games medallists in netball
Australia international netball players
Suncorp Super Netball players
Sydney Swifts players
Australia international Fast5 players
New South Wales Institute of Sport netball players
2011 World Netball Championships players
2015 Netball World Cup players
Medallists at the 2010 Commonwealth Games
Medallists at the 2014 Commonwealth Games